Sean Gleeson (born ) is a former Ireland international rugby league footballer who played in the 2000s and 2010s.

Background
Gleeson was born in Wigan, Greater Manchester, England.

Sean Gleeson is the cousin of the rugby league footballer Martin Gleeson, and the rugby league footballer Mark Gleeson.

Career
He came in to the Wigan side due to injury, and was then loaned out to Widnes Vikings.

Gleeson was named in the Ireland squad for the 2008 Rugby League World Cup.

It was announced on 11 June 2012 that Sean Gleeson will move to Hull KR for the 2013 season. On 8 January 2013 it emerged that his start to the season might be delayed due to a back injury sustained in training.

In March 2014, Gleeson was taken to hospital with a serious eye injury after being assaulted outside a nightclub in his hometown. On 2 June 2014 he announced that he was to quit Rugby League at the age of 26 due to the injury.

References

External links
Statistics at wigan.rlfans.com
 (archived by web.archive.org) Statistics at wigan.rlfans.com
Statistics at rugbyleagueproject.org
(archived by web.archive.org) Wakefield profile
 Ireland profile
 (archived by web.archive.org) Interview with Sean Gleeson
 (archived by web.archive.org) Statistics at rugby.widnes.tv
Search for "Sean Gleeson" at bbc.co.uk

1987 births
Living people
English people of Irish descent
English rugby league players
Hull Kingston Rovers players
Ireland national rugby league team players
Rugby league centres
Rugby league fullbacks
Rugby league players from Wigan
Rugby league wingers
Salford Red Devils players
Wakefield Trinity players
Widnes Vikings players
Wigan Warriors players